Brian Colin Castle (born 7 September 1949) is a retired bishop in the Church of England, the most recent Bishop suffragan of Tonbridge. He retired from that See on 31 October 2015.

Castle was educated at Wilson's School and University College London. He was ordained in 1978 after studying at Cuddesdon. He began his ordained ministry as a curate at St Nicholas' Sutton and was then successively priest in charge at Solwezi, Zambia, Vicar of Northmore Green, Somerset and Director of Pastoral Studies at Ripon College Cuddesdon before his ordination to the episcopate. He was consecrated a bishop by George Carey, Archbishop of Canterbury, on 24 January 2002 at Rochester Cathedral, and installed there in the same service. In 1989 he was awarded a PhD in theology from the University of Birmingham.
  He is married to Jane, with whom he has three children.

Styles
 Brian Castle (1949–1978)
 The Reverend Brian Castle (1978–1989)
 The Reverend Doctor Brian Castle (1989–2002)
 The Right Reverend Doctor Brian Castle (2002–present)

References

1949 births
People educated at Wilson's School, Wallington
Alumni of University College London
Alumni of Ripon College Cuddesdon
Alumni of the University of Birmingham
Bishops of Tonbridge
21st-century Church of England bishops
Living people